Slovakia is a nation that has competed at the Hopman Cup tournament on eight occasions, first competing at the 10th Hopman Cup in 1998. They have won the title three times: in 1998, 2005 and 2009.

Before its dissolution, Slovakia used to form part of Czechoslovakia which competed at the first four Hopman Cups, from 1989 until 1992.

Players
This is a list of players who have played for Slovakia in the Hopman Cup.

Results

1 In 2000, Henrieta Nagyová was forced to retire during her singles match in the tie against Thailand and was also unable to compete in the mixed doubles, thus forfeiting both points. Because of this injury, Slovakia was unable to play in their final tie against Australia.
2 In the final round robin tie of 2004, Australia had to concede both the women's singles and the mixed doubles to Slovakia due to an injury to Alicia Molik. As group leaders, Australia were also due to play in the final but were unable to following Molik's injury, thus Slovakia was promoted to the final against the United States.
3 In the 2005 tie versus the Netherlands, the Netherlands had to forfeit both the men's singles and the mixed doubles due to an injury to the Dutch competitor, Peter Wessels, giving Slovakia a two-point advantage. In the final, after losing the two singles matches, Argentina conceded victory to Slovakia in the mixed doubles dead rubber as a walkover.
4 German Nicolas Kiefer was forced to retire in the men's singles versus Slovakia and was unable to compete in the mixed doubles, thus conceding both points to the Slovaks. In the final, after losing both singles matches, Russia chose not to play the dead rubber mixed doubles, thus forfeiting the point to Slovakia.

See also
Czechoslovakia at the Hopman Cup

References

Hopman Cup teams
Hopman Cup
Hopman Cup